This is a list of notable automobile manufacturers with articles on Wikipedia by country. It is a subset of the list of automobile manufacturers for manufacturers based in South America. It includes companies that are in business as well as defunct manufacturers.

Brazil 

Agrale (1962)
BMW Brazil (2014)
Caterpillar Brazil (1960)
Chamonix (1987)
Comil (1985)
Effa Brazil (2006)
Fabral (2002)
Fiat Automóveis (1976)
Ford Brasil (1919)
Troller (1995)
General Motors do Brasil (1925)
Honda Brazil (-)
Hyundai Brazil (-)
John Deere Brazil (-)
Komatsu do Brazil (1975)
Marcopolo S.A. (1949)
Neobus (1999)
Mascarello (2003)
Mercedes-Benz Brazil (-)
MMC Automotores do Brasil (-)
Nissan Brasil (2001)
Obvio! (-)
PSA Peugeot Citroën do Brasil (-)
Renault do Brasil (1997)
Scania Latin America (1957)
TAC (2004)
Valtra do Brasil (1950s)
VLEGA (2006)
Volkswagen do Brasil (1953)
Audi Senna (1993)
MAN (1995)

Mexico 
DINA S.A. (1971)
Fiat Chrysler Automobiles (1930)
Mastretta (1987)
Solana (1936)
Zacua (2017)

See also
 List of automobile manufacturers
 List of automobile marques

Latin American